Francisco Raul "Quico" Canseco (born July 30, 1949) is an American attorney, businessman, and former U.S. Representative for . He is a member of the Republican Party.

Early life and education
Canseco was born and reared in Laredo in Webb County in south Texas, the eldest of eight children of Consuelo Sada Rangel and Dr. Francisco Manuel Canseco, who were both born in Monterrey, Mexico. He earned a B.A in History from Saint Louis University in 1972. He went on to earn a J.D. from Saint Louis University School of Law in 1975. He is a brother in the Tau Kappa Epsilon International Fraternity. His father was of Italian descent and his mother was of Sephardic Jewish descent.

Legal/business career
Canseco began his legal career in 1975 as an associate attorney with Mann, Castillon, Fried and Kazen in Laredo. Afterwards, he operated his own practice for five years. Then he joined Person, Whitworth, Ramos, Borchers, and Morales in Laredo as a participating associate. In 1987, he left that firm to become general counsel at Union National Bank of Texas, where he stayed until 1992. He was later counsel to Escamilla and Ponek, from 2003 until 2007. He became chairman of Texas Heritage Bancshares from 2001 until 2007.

Since 1988, Canseco has been President/Director of FMC Developers, which includes Canseco Investments (incorporated in 1993). He, along with Chairman James William Danner Sr., took Hondo National Bank from being a failing bank with $8 Million in assets and one location, to an institution with over $180 Million and four branches today. Canseco served as Board President since 1995.

U.S. House of Representatives

Elections

2004

Canseco ran for the newly redrawn Texas's 28th congressional district. In the Republican primary, he and attorney Jim Hopson qualified for a run-off election. Canseco got just 21% of the vote, while Hopson got 49% of the vote (barely missing the 50% threshold to win the primary). In the run-off election, Hopson defeated Canseco 65%–35%.

2008

Canseco was defeated in the Republican primary by Bexar County Commissioner and former San Antonio city councilman Lyle Larson 62%–38%.

2010

In the Republican primary, Canseco and CIA officer Will Hurd qualified for a run-off election; Hurd got 34%, while Canseco got 32%. In the run-off, Canseco defeated Hurd 53%–47%.

In the general election, Canseco faced incumbent Democratic congressman Ciro Rodriguez. The Republican National Committee gave strong financial support to Canseco in an effort to regain the seat for the Republicans. As of October 13, 2010, Rodriguez had raised more cash overall ($1,481,520 versus Canseco's $980,821), but Canseco had more cash on hand ($147,961 versus Rodriguez's $90,915).

Canseco defeated Rodriguez 49%–44%.

2012

Ciro Rodriguez filed for a rematch with Canseco in 2012, but he lost the Democratic primary to State Representative Pete Gallego, 55%–45%.

In the November 6 general election, Gallego defeated Canseco 50%–46%. Two minor candidates held the remaining 4.1% of the ballots. The race was contested amid allegations of voter fraud and irregularities. On November 9, Canseco conceded to Gallego, citing the high costs and lengthy period of time required to contest the election. Although Canseco continued to allege numerous irregularities, he had concluded that "a full investigation and recount would be expensive and time-consuming," considering that the 23rd District embraces all or parts of 29 counties.  Canseco carried the district's portion of Bexar County, home to more than half the district's population.  However, it was not enough to overcome Gallego's margins in the central and western portions of the district, which were virtually coextensive with Gallego's old state House district.  Gallego also dominated the heavily Hispanic border areas.

2014

In a bid to return to Congress, Canseco polled 10,204 votes (40.4%) in the Republican primary on March 4. In the May 27 runoff Hurd handily defeated Canseco, 8,698 (59.5%) to 5,924 (40.5%). Hurd faced freshman Democratic Representative Pete Gallego in the November 4 general election, and ultimately won.

2018

In another bid to return to Congress, Canseco ran in the 18-way Republican primary for Texas's 21st congressional district to succeed the retiring incumbent Republican Lamar Smith. He was ultimately unsuccessful, garnering less than 5% of the vote.

Tenure

Canseco describes himself as a "limited-government conservative."

He supports the Arizona immigration law. He supports the extension of the Bush tax cuts and repealing the Patient Protection and Affordable Care Act. During the campaign, Canseco openly identified with the Tea Party movement.

Canseco was a member of the Republican Study Committee, a caucus of conservative House Republicans.  During his tenure, he was one of four voting Latino members of Congress known to be a member of the RSC, the others being Bill Flores of Texas, Raul Labrador of Idaho and Jaime Herrera Beutler of Washington. He was also a member of the Congressional Hispanic Conference. In 2012, Canseco delivered the Spanish language version of the Republican response to the State of the Union address.

In summer 2011, Canseco was criticized after initially declining to introduce a bill allowing for a swap of land between the Federal Government and Bexar County, Texas. The bill, which was supported by United States Secretary of the Interior Ken Salazar and sponsored by retiring Senator Kay Bailey Hutchison in the Senate, would expand the development of the San Antonio River to the San Antonio Missions National Historical Park.

In October 2011, Canseco introduced the San Antonio Missions National Historical Park Boundary Expansion Act in the House, which mirrored Hutchison's Senate bill. The legislation would cost roughly $4 million over four years, even though the lands would be donated.

In April 2012, Canseco traveled using the San Antonio International Airport. He said that he was assaulted by the Transportation Security Administration when an officer "was patting me down where no one is supposed to go."  The TSA officer said that he was assaulted by Canseco, but no arrests were made. Canseco advocates for changes in security procedures.

Canseco reportedly voted with his party 96% of the time on all issues.

Committee assignments
 Committee on Financial Services
 Subcommittee on Financial Institutions and Consumer Credit
 Subcommittee on Oversight and Investigations

Personal life
Canseco and his wife, Gloria, have been married since 1979. The couple resides in San Antonio. They have three children and attend St. Matthew's Roman Catholic Church. He attended Culver Military Academy in his youth.

Electoral history

2012

2010

See also
List of Hispanic and Latino Americans in the United States Congress

References

External links

 Congressman Quico Canseco official U.S. House website
 Quico Canseco for Congress official campaign website
 
 

1949 births
Living people
American bankers
American politicians of Mexican descent
American real estate businesspeople
Hispanic and Latino American members of the United States Congress
People from Laredo, Texas
People from San Antonio
Saint Louis University alumni
Texas lawyers
Tea Party movement activists
Republican Party members of the United States House of Representatives from Texas
American people of Sephardic-Jewish descent
Activists from Texas
21st-century American politicians
Catholics from Texas
Culver Academies alumni